Novato (Spanish for "Novatus") is a city in Marin County, California, in the North Bay region of the Bay Area. At the 2020 census, Novato had a population of 53,225.

History
What is now Novato was originally the site of several Coast Miwok villages: Chokecherry, near downtown Novato; Puyuku, near Ignacio; and Olómpali, at the present-day Olompali State Historic Park.

Mexican era

In 1839, the Mexican government granted the  Rancho Novato to Fernando Feliz. The rancho was named after a local Miwok leader who had probably been given the name of Saint Novatus at his baptism.

Post-Conquest era
Following the American Conquest of California and the Treaty of Guadalupe Hidalgo, Novato, along with the rest of California, became part of the United States on February 2, 1848. Early pioneers included Joseph Sweetser and Francis De Long who bought  in the mid-1850s and planted orchards and vineyards.

The first post office at Novato opened in 1856; it closed in 1860, and a new post office opened in 1891.

The first school was built in 1859, at the corner of Grant Avenue and what is today Redwood Boulevard.

The original town was located around Novato Creek at what is now South Novato Boulevard. A railroad was built in 1879, connecting Novato to Sonoma County and San Rafael. The area around the train depot became known as New Town, and forms the edge of what today is Old Town Novato. The Novato Flatiron Building was built in 1908.

Modern era
The Great Depression of the 1930s had a marked effect on the area as many farmers lost their land. After World War II, Novato grew quickly with the construction of tract homes and a freeway. As the area was unincorporated much of the growth was unplanned and uncontrolled.
 
Novato was finally incorporated as a city in 1960. One of the most important venues of the time (1960 to 1965) was "Western Weekend". Beard-growing contests, sponsored by Bob's Barber Shop, and many other odd activities helped to bring this community together.

Geography

Major geographical features nearby include Mount Burdell and Mount Burdell Open Space Preserve to the north and Big Rock Ridge to the southwest. Stafford Lake to the west is a secondary water supply for Novato, with the Russian River in Sonoma County to the north supplying most of the city's water.
Novato includes ten Marin County Open Space District preserves: Mount Burdell, Rush Creek, Little Mountain, Verissimo Hills, Indian Tree, Deer Island, Indian Valley, Ignacio Valley, Loma Verde, and Pacheco Valle. Although Novato is located on the water, access to the water is blocked by expansive farmland and wetlands.

Climate

Official weather observations were taken at Hamilton Air Force Base through 1964.

Today, the nearest National Weather Service cooperative weather station is in San Rafael, where records date back to 1894. Compared to records from Hamilton Air Force Base, San Rafael is generally several degrees warmer than Novato and has an average of about  more rainfall.

According to the Köppen Climate Classification system, Novato has a warm-summer mediterranean climate, abbreviated "Csb" on climate maps. This means that Summers are Hot, but Winters are rainy and can be mild to chilly. Precipitation occurs in the colder seasons, but there are a number of clear sunny days even during the wetter seasons, except during spells of seasonal tule fog, when it can be quite chilly for many days.

Government

From 2008 to 2012, Huffman represented Marin County in the California State Assembly.

In the California State Legislature, Novato is in:
  
  .

According to the California Secretary of State, as of February 10, 2019, Novato has 31,544 registered voters. Of those, 15,794 (50.1%) are registered Democrats, 6,048 (19.2%) are registered Republicans, and 8,188 (26%) have declined to state a political party.

Demographics

2010

At the 2010 census Novato had a population of 51,904. The racial makeup of Novato was 39,443 (76.0%) White, 1,419 (2.7%) African American, 286 (0.6%) Native American, 3,428 (6.6%) Asian, 117 (0.2%) Pacific Islander, 4,693 (9.0%) from other races, and 2,518 (4.9%) from two or more races. Hispanic or Latino of any race were 11,046 persons (21.3%).

The census reported that 51,278 people (98.8% of the population) lived in households, 449 (0.9%) lived in non-institutionalized group quarters, and 177 (0.3%) were institutionalized.

There were 21,279 households, 6,679 (32.9%) had children under the age of 18 living in them, 10,393 (51.3%) were opposite-sex married couples living together, 2,237 (11.0%) had a female householder with no husband present, 854 (4.2%) had a male householder with no wife present. There were 1,010 (5.0%) unmarried opposite-sex partnerships, and 195 (1.0%) same-sex married couples or partnerships. 5,358 households (26.4%) were one person and 2,415 (11.9%) had someone living alone who was 65 or older. The average household size was 2.53. There were 13,484 families (66.5% of households); the average family size was 3.04.

The age distribution was 11,769 people (22.7%) under the age of 18, 3,355 people (6.5%) aged 18 to 24, 12,743 people (24.6%) aged 25 to 44, 15,914 people (30.7%) aged 45 to 64, and 8,123 people (15.7%) who were 65 or older. The median age was 42.6 years. For every 100 females, there were 93.6 males. For every 100 females age 18 and over, there were 90.1 males.

There were 21,158 housing units at an average density of 756.8 per square mile, of the occupied units 13,591 (67.0%) were owner-occupied and 6,688 (33.0%) were rented. The homeowner vacancy rate was 1.0%; the rental vacancy rate was 4.7%. 33,252 people (64.1% of the population) lived in owner-occupied housing units and 18,026 people (34.7%) lived in rental housing units.

2000

At the 2000 census there were 47,630 people in 18,524 households, including 12,411 families, in the city. The population density was 1,719.2 inhabitants per square mile (663.9/km). The racial makeup of the city in 2010 was 65.8% non-Hispanic White American, 2.5% non-Hispanic Black American, 0.2% Native American, 6.5% Asian, 0.2% Pacific Islander, 0.3% from other races, and 3.2% from two or more races. Hispanic or Latino of any race were 21.3%.

Of the 18,524 households 32.1% had children under the age of 18 living with them, 52.7% were married couples living together, 10.3% had a female householder with no husband present, and 33.0% were non-families. 25.2% of households were one person and 9.3% were one person aged 65 or older. The average household size was 2.52 and the average family size was 3.01.

The age distribution was 23.1% under the age of 18, 6.4% from 18 to 24, 29.9% from 25 to 44, 27.5% from 45 to 64, and 13.0% 65 or older. The median age was 40 years. For every 100 females, there were 93.6 males. For every 100 females age 18 and over, there were 90.3 males.

The median household income was $63,453 and the median family income was $74,434 (these figures had risen to $78,895 and $91,890 respectively as of a 2007 estimate). Males had a median income of $55,822 versus $40,287 for females. The per capita income for the city was $32,402. About 3.1% of families and 5.6% of the population were below the poverty line, including 6.1% of those under age 18 and 4.0% of those age 65 or over.

Economy

The city is home to the Buck Institute for Research on Aging, and several biotech firms, such as Biosearch Technologies, BioMarin Pharmaceutical and Ultragenyx. Several small technology companies are also based in Novato, such as 2K, Radiant Logic, Toys For Bob, One Legal, International Genetics Incorporated, Channel Management Solutions, Enwisen, Sonic Solutions and DriveSavers.

The former Hamilton Air Force Base is also located in Novato, but was decommissioned in 1974 and designated a Historic District in 1998. After lying stagnant for many years, major renovations were pushed through by then-mayor Michael DiGiorgio. As of 2008 the base has largely been redeveloped into single-family homes. The former hangar buildings were gutted and redeveloped into two-story office buildings; tenants include 2K Sports, Sony Imageworks, Visual Concepts, The Republic of Tea, Toys For Bob, and Birkenstock Distribution USA.

From 1983 to 1998, the iconic developer of video games, Brøderbund Software, was headquartered in Novato, known through games Choplifter, Lode Runner, Karateka, and Prince of Persia, and others. From the 1982 until 2015, Novato was headquarters for Fireman's Fund Insurance Company, which was Marin County's largest employer at one time, with 2,400 employees as of 2000. By 2015, the company had laid off or transferred most its employees and relocated its remaining employees to a smaller headquarters in nearby Petaluma.

In Eastern Novato, north of Hamilton, there are several hayfields contributing to the local economy, but they are diminishing as more and more of them are restored to wetlands.

Top employers

As of 2018–19 the city's principal employers were:

Culture

Prominent museums in Novato include:
Marin Museum of the American Indian
Marin Museum of Contemporary Art
Hamilton Field Aviation Museum
Olompali State Historic Park

Other museums in Novato include the Novato History Museum, the Space Station Museum, the Marin Treks Natural History Museum, and the Novato Roundhouse. Other notable attractions in Novato include the Harkleroad wind turbine, the Point Reyes National Seashore, Miwok Park, the Hamilton Wetlands, and the Mount Burdell Open Space Preserve.

Education
Novato is served by the Novato Unified School District. Notable public high schools include Novato High School and San Marin High School. Novato Charter School is a charter school in Novato.

Transportation

Major highways in Novato include U.S. Route 101 and California State Route 37, and major roads in Novato include Atherton Avenue, Novato Boulevard, San Marin Drive, and Ignacio Boulevard.

Sonoma–Marin Area Rail Transit (SMART) operates three commuter rail stations in Novato: San Marin / Atherton station, Hamilton station, and Novato Downtown station. Novato is also served by several bus routes of Golden Gate Transit and Marin Transit, with a transit center in the downtown area, which serves 2 Golden Gate Transit routes and 6 Marin Transit routes.

Notable people

Joe Rosenthal, photographer of Raising the Flag on Iwo Jima, Pulitzer Prize winner
Sacheen Littlefeather, activist for Native American civil rights
Elmo Shropshire, veterinarian and musician known for the Christmas song "Grandma Got Run Over by a Reindeer".
Rebecca Solnit, author, memoirist, essayist
Emil Kakkis, President and CEO of Ultragenyx Pharmaceutical Inc.
Jared Goff, NFL quarterback
Juan Alderete, Grammy Award-winning bassist for Marilyn Manson and former bassist of The Mars Volta and Racer X
Manny Wilkins, NFL quarterback
Yvonne Cagle, NASA astronaut 
Ralph Barbieri, sports journalist and host of The Razor and Mr. T on KNBR
Brent Moore, former NFL linebacker
Brad Muster, NFL and Stanford University running back
Nick Rolovich, head football coach for the University of Hawaiʻi at Mānoa
Mike Moroski, former NFL quarterback and current head football coach for The College of Idaho
Wil Dasovich, television personality
Sandy Pearlman, music producer and critic
Ellen Estes, Olympic Water Polo player
Lefty Gomez, pitcher for the New York Yankees and the Washington Senators during the 1930s and 1940s, member of the Baseball Hall of Fame
Cynthia Harvey, ballet dancer and educator
Jon Miller, sports broadcaster, most notably with the San Francisco Giants

In popular culture
 Parts of Radio Flyer (1992) were filmed in Novato. The film starred Elijah Wood (The Lord of the Rings) and was directed by Richard Donner (Lethal Weapon, Superman).
 The Fireman's Fund office complex in Novato was used as a shooting location in Howard the Duck (1986) and Star Trek VI: The Undiscovered Country (1991). The site features in exterior shots for the Khitomer Conference between humans and Klingons.
 Hamilton AFB (closed) was used as the location for filming the lab fire in Emergency! TV movie "The Convention".

Sister cities
  Shepparton, Australia

References

External links

 
 A Century of Gentle Seasons, The History of Novato

 
1960 establishments in California
Cities in Marin County, California
Cities in the San Francisco Bay Area
Incorporated cities and towns in California